Don MacDougall is an American sound engineer. He won an Oscar for Best Sound and was nominated for four more in the same category. He worked on more than 130 films between 1974 and 1999.

Selected filmography
MacDougall won an Academy Award for Best Sound and was nominated for four more.

Won
 Star Wars Episode IV: A New Hope (1977)

Nominated
 Funny Lady (1975)
 Close Encounters of the Third Kind (1977)
 Hooper (1978)
 1941 (1979)

References

External links

Year of birth missing (living people)
Living people
American audio engineers
Best Sound BAFTA Award winners
Best Sound Mixing Academy Award winners
Emmy Award winners